Naquetia vokesae is a species of sea snail, a marine gastropod mollusk in the family Muricidae, the murex snails or rock snails.

Description

Distribution
This marine species occurs off Mozambique, South Africa, N Zululand and Natal; Madagascar; Comoros Islands; Tanzania and Southern Zanzibar in the western Indian Ocean and probably the Philippines, in the Pacific Ocean.

References

 Steyn, D.G & Lussi, M. (2005). Offshore Shells of Southern Africa: A pictorial guide to more than 750 Gastropods. Published by the authors. Pp. i–vi, 1–289.
 Houart, R.; Kilburn, R. N. & Marais, A. P. (2010). Muricidae. pp. 176–270, in: Marais A.P. & Seccombe A.D. (eds), Identification guide to the seashells of South Africa. Volume 1. Groenkloof: Centre for Molluscan Studies. 376 pp.
 Houart, R., Moe, C. & Chen C. (2021). Living species of the genera Chicomurex Arakawa, 1964 and Naquetia Jousseaume, 1880 (Gastropoda: Muricidae) in the Indo-West Pacific. Novapex. 22 (hors-série 14): 1–52.

External links
 Houart, R. (1986). Chicoreus (Naquetia) triquiter vokesae subs. nov., a new name for a misidentified species (Gastropoda: Muricidae. Apex. 1(3): 95–97

Muricidae
Gastropods described in 1986